Alvester Garnett (born July 17, 1970) is an American jazz drummer who, among many other productions, has appeared on Great Performances on PBS in a tribute to Kurt Weill. Garnett has played with Abbey Lincoln, Betty Carter, Regina Carter, Clark Terry, Pharoah Sanders, Dee Dee Bridgewater, Teddy Edwards, James Carter, Cyrus Chestnut, Charenee Wade, Lou Donaldson, Benny Golson, Al Grey, Rodney Jones, and Sherman Irby, and others.

Discography

As sideman
With Regina Carter
 2000 Motor City Moments
 2003 Paganini: After a Dream
 2006 I'll Be Seeing You: A Sentimental Journey
 2010 Reverse Thread
 2014 Southern Comfort
 2017 Ella: Accentuate the Positive

With Abbey Lincoln
 1996 Who Used to Dance
 1999 Wholly Earth

With others
 1996 Earth Stories, Cyrus Chestnut
 1998 A Cloud of Red Dust, Stefon Harris
 1998 In Carterian Fashion, James Carter (Atlantic)
 1999 Rhapsody, Paul Kendall
 2000 Shades of Blue, Anna-Lisa
 2003 Timeless, Loston Harris
 2006 Organ Starter, Sherman Irby
 2009 In My Life, Rondi Charleston
 2010 Three's Company, Bill Cunliffe/Holly Hofmann

References

American jazz drummers
1970 births
Living people
People from Maywood, New Jersey
20th-century American drummers
American male drummers
21st-century American drummers
20th-century American male musicians
21st-century American male musicians
American male jazz musicians